Lany may refer to:

Places
 Lány (Chrudim District), a village in Pardubice Region, Czech Republic
 Lány (Havlíčkův Brod District), a village in Vysočina Region, Czech Republic
 Lány (Kladno District), a village in Central Bohemian Region, Czech Republic, with a summer residence of Czech Presidents
 Łany, Lower Silesian Voivodeship (south-west Poland)
 Łany, Krasnystaw County in Lublin Voivodeship (east Poland)
 Łany, Kraśnik County in Lublin Voivodeship (east Poland)
 Łany, Puławy County in Lublin Voivodeship (east Poland)
 Łany, Jędrzejów County in Świętokrzyskie Voivodeship (south-central Poland)
 Łany, Opatów County in Świętokrzyskie Voivodeship (south-central Poland)
 Łany, Silesian Voivodeship (south Poland)
 Łany, Opole Voivodeship (south-west Poland)
 Łany, West Pomeranian Voivodeship (north-west Poland)

People with the surname
 Benjamin Lany (1591–1675), English academic and bishop
 Dorothy May De Lany (1908–1970), New Zealand hotel worker and trade unionist
 Edward Lany (1667–1728), Master of Pembroke College, Cambridge (from 1707)

Other uses
 LANY, an American pop rock band
 Lawyers Alliance for New York

See also
 Laney (disambiguation)
 Lány (disambiguation)
 Łany (disambiguation)